The Qatar women's national football team is a women's association football team representing Qatar and controlled by Qatar Football Association (QFA). The team is largely inactive and currently unranked in the FIFA world ranking.

History

2022 FIFA World Cup Bid
Qatar is a conservative Islamic country which is experiencing some modernisation. Part of this modernisation includes the increasing visibility of sport. In order to place a bid for the World Cup, an official women's team had to be established. In 2010, it debuted at the first women's Arab tournament in the region, the Arabia Women's Cup as it was the team first participation at international level. They were not successful and finished last of the group, losing all matches against teams from Bahrain, Palestine and Syria.

New Era
In 2012, Qatar appointed a new coach for the national team, Monika Staab, a former German player. Her tenure led to improvements, which were reflected in their first two wins and reducing the goals difference from conceding +10 goals in one match to less than 7 goals. From 2012 to 2013, the Qatar Football Association has hosted seven friendlies matches in Doha against teams from South Asia and West Asia including Afghanistan, Maldives and Nepal, where the Qatari team enjoyed its first win, a 4:1 win against the Maldivian team. These friendly games led Qatar's women's team to the 111th place on the 2013 FIFA ranking.

At the 2014 WAFF Women's Championship in Jordan, Qatar played against Jordan, Palestine and Bahrain. Qatar finished last, losing all games while Dana Al-Jassim and Reem Al-Naemi scored one goal each, and suffering 19 goals.

Inactivity
Following their loss in 2014 WAFF Women's Championship, the team went inactive not playing a single game for more than 18 months, making them unranked in the FIFA ranking.
Qatar women's team has appeared in some special events, like playing friendlies against the American football club Washington Spirit in December 2020, and against Afghanistan after their evacuation from Afghanistan after the Taliban takeover in which they won 5-0. Qatar does not have any player development program.

Results and fixtures

The following is a list of match results in the last 12 months, as well as any future matches that have been scheduled.
Legend

2023
 
 Qatar Fixtures and Results – Soccerway.com

Coaching staff

Current coaching staff

Manager history

Players

Current squad
The following players were named on April 2014 for the 2014 WAFF Women's Championship.

Caps and goals accurate up to and including 19 August 2022.

Recent call-ups
The following players have been called up to the squad in the past 12 months.

*Active players in bold, statistics correct as of 30 September 2021.

Most capped players

Top goalscorers

-->

Competitive record

WAFF Women's Championship

Arabia Women's Cup

See also
Sport in Qatar
Football in Qatar
Women's football in Qatar.
Qatar  women's national under-20 football team
Qatar  women's national under-17 football team
Qatar men's national football team

References

External links

َArabic women's national association football teams
Asian women's national association football teams
Women's football in Qatar
Qatari sportswomen
W